Craig Llysfaen, also known as Lisvane Graig, is a prominent hill of 265 m above sea level,  overlooking Cardiff, some 7 miles north of the city centre.

The views (on a good day) include Newport City, the two Severn bridges to the east, Pen Y Fan and the Brecon Beacons to the north and Cardiff City to the south.

Mountains and hills of Cardiff